The 2020–21 Newcastle United Football Club season was the club's 128th season in existence and the club's 4th consecutive season in the top flight of English football. In addition to the domestic league, Newcastle United participated in this season's editions of the FA Cup and the EFL Cup.

First team

Transfers

Transfers in

Transfers out

Loans in

Loans out

Pre-season and friendlies

Competitions

Overview

Premier League

League table

Results summary

Results by matchday

Matches
The 2020–21 season fixtures were released on 20 August.

FA Cup

The third round draw was made on 30 November, with Premier League and EFL Championship clubs all entering the competition.

EFL Cup

The draw for both the second and third round were confirmed on September 6, live on Sky Sports by Phil Babb. The fourth round draw was conducted on 17 September 2020 by Laura Woods and Lee Hendrie live on Sky Sports.

Statistics

Appearances and goals

|-
! colspan=14 style=background:#dcdcdc; text-align:center| Goalkeepers

|-
! colspan=14 style=background:#dcdcdc; text-align:center| Defenders

|-
! colspan=14 style=background:#dcdcdc; text-align:center| Midfielders

 

|-
! colspan=14 style=background:#dcdcdc; text-align:center| Forwards

|-
! colspan=14 style=background:#dcdcdc; text-align:center| Player(s) who left permanently but featured this season

References

External links

Newcastle United F.C. seasons
Newcastle United F.C.